Andrew Haben (December 23, 1834January 18, 1908) was a German American immigrant, businessman, Democratic politician, and Wisconsin pioneer.  He was the 19th and 24th mayor of Oshkosh, Wisconsin, and represented Winnebago County in the Wisconsin State Senate and Assembly.  He was also an unsuccessful candidate for U.S. Congress.

Biography

Born in the Rhine Province, in the Kingdom of Prussia, Haben emigrated with his parents to the United States in 1837 and settled in Dansville, New York. In 1855, Haben moved to Oshkosh, Wisconsin, and worked as a merchant tailor.  He also became active in the real estate trade in Oshkosh.

Haben became active with the Democratic Party of Wisconsin, and was elected mayor of Oshkosh in 1876 and 1877. In 1878, he was elected to the Wisconsin State Senate from the 19th State Senate district.  At the time, the district comprised all of Winnebago County.  Haben was the first Democrat to represent Winnebago County in the Wisconsin State Senate since 1856.

During his first year as state senator, he was the Democratic nominee for State Treasurer of Wisconsin.  He was defeated along with the rest of the Democratic ticket in the 1879 general election.

He was subsequently elected to the Wisconsin State Assembly from Winnebago County's 1st Assembly district.  In 1882, he ran for a seat in the United States House of Representatives, in Wisconsin's 6th congressional district, but was defeated by incumbent Richard W. Guenther.

He was elected to another term in the State Assembly in 1884, and during that term, he was elected to another term as mayor in 1885.  In 1886, he ran for Congress again, but was defeated again, by Guenther's successor, Charles B. Clark.

Haben retired from business and politics in 1890 and moved with his family to Denver, Colorado.  He stayed for nine years, but abandoned Colorado after a fire destroyed much of his property there in 1899.  He returned to Oshkosh, but had little further engagement in business or politics.  He died of heart disease at his home in Oshkosh, on January 18, 1908.

Electoral history

Wisconsin Senate (1878)

| colspan="6" style="text-align:center;background-color: #e9e9e9;"| General Election, November 5, 1878

Wisconsin State Treasurer (1879)

| colspan="6" style="text-align:center;background-color: #e9e9e9;"| General Election, November 4, 1879

Wisconsin Assembly (1881)

| colspan="6" style="text-align:center;background-color: #e9e9e9;"| General Election, November 8, 1881

U.S. House of Representatives (1882)

| colspan="6" style="text-align:center;background-color: #e9e9e9;"| General Election, November 7, 1882

Wisconsin Assembly (1884)

| colspan="6" style="text-align:center;background-color: #e9e9e9;"| General Election, November 4, 1884

U.S. House of Representatives (1886)

| colspan="6" style="text-align:center;background-color: #e9e9e9;"| General Election, November 2, 1886

References

1834 births
1908 deaths
Prussian emigrants to the United States
Politicians from Oshkosh, Wisconsin
Businesspeople from Wisconsin
School board members in Wisconsin
Wisconsin city council members
Mayors of places in Wisconsin
Democratic Party Wisconsin state senators
Democratic Party members of the Wisconsin State Assembly
19th-century American politicians
19th-century American businesspeople